Barbara J. Linton, (born June 27, 1952) was a Wisconsin politician and legislator. She served in the Wisconsin State Assembly from 1986 to 1998.

Born in Ashland, Wisconsin, she attended Northland College, and currently lives in High Bridge. She was the Ashland County Board Supervisor from 1984 to 1988. While serving in the State Assembly as a Democrat for 12 years, she later ran unsuccessfully as a Republican.

Notes

People from Ashland, Wisconsin
People from Ashland County, Wisconsin
Northland College (Wisconsin) alumni
Democratic Party members of the Wisconsin State Assembly
Women state legislators in Wisconsin
1952 births
Living people
21st-century American women